Nicole Borvo (born 8 December 1945) is a member of the Senate of France, representing Paris.  She is a member of the Communist, Republican, and Citizen Group.

References
Page on the Senate website (in French)

1945 births
Living people
French Senators of the Fifth Republic
Women members of the Senate (France)
21st-century French women politicians
Senators of Paris
20th-century French Jews
Politicians from Marseille
Sciences Po alumni